Novaya Chigla is a rural locality (a selo) and the administrative center of Novochigolskoye Rural Settlement, Talovsky District, Voronezh Oblast, Russia. The population was 2,474 as of 2010. There are 42 streets.

Geography 
Novaya Chigla is located 30 km west of Talovaya (the district's administrative centre) by road. Staraya Chigla is the nearest rural locality.

References 

Rural localities in Talovsky District